Nomatemba Gugulethu Pudnixia Olivia Tambo (known as Thembi Tambo, born 1957) is a British-South African diplomat and politician, who was appointed High Commissioner of South Africa to the United Kingdom in March 2018. He was succeeded from 1 November 2022 by Jeremiah Nyamane Mamabolo.

Education 
Tambo has a BA in History and English at the University of Roehampton in London. This was followed by a law degree at University of the Witwatersrand in 2002. In 2007, she completed her diplomatic training.

Career 
Tambo was part of the Anti-Apartheid Movement.

Personal life 
Tambo is the daughter of Oliver Tambo. She attended the dedication of a statue to him in 2019.

References 

Living people
21st-century South African politicians
21st-century South African women politicians
South African diplomats
High Commissioners of South Africa to the United Kingdom
Alumni of the University of Roehampton
University of the Witwatersrand alumni
21st-century diplomats
Year of birth missing (living people)
Anti-apartheid activists